William Whittingham Lyman (born July 28, 1850, in Pittsburgh, Pennsylvania – 1921) was the son of Theodore Benedict Lyman. He built the Lyman winery, now known as the El Molino winery. At one point Lyman owned the property of what is now the Bale Grist Mill State Historic Park. He helped found Grace Episcopal Church of St. Helena, California. Lyman was a Lieutenant Colonel in the State militia, and was a member of Governor Bartlett's staff and an Aide-de-camp.  He was married in Sacramento, in 1880, to Mrs. Sarah A. Nowland. They had two sons: Theodore Benedict, Jr. and William Whittingham Lyman Jr.

Career
He resided at his birthplace until 1860, when he, with his parents, went to Europe and remained there for ten years. During this time, he was educated at the School of Mines, at Freiberg, Saxony, and at the University of Berlin. In December 1870, he returned to America, and in 1871, he came to California, where he engaged in wine-making, general farming, milling etc. Mr. Lyman was the Secretary of the Napa Valley Wine Company, one of the most extensive companies engaged in the wine business in the State.

References

External links
 
 

American winemakers
Wine merchants
1850 births
1921 deaths
People from Napa County, California
American expatriates in Germany